Moraine Canyon is a canyon with very steep rock walls,  long, indenting northern Nilsen Plateau just west of Fram Mesa, in the Queen Maud Mountains of Antarctica. It was mapped by the United States Geological Survey from surveys and U.S. Navy air photos, 1960–64, and was so named by the Advisory Committee on Antarctic Names because the canyon floor is completely covered by glacial moraine.

References

Canyons and gorges of Antarctica
Landforms of the Ross Dependency
Amundsen Coast